Hueicomilla Airport ,  is an airstrip serving Hueicolla, a Pacific coastal settlement in the La Unión commune of Chile's Los Ríos Region.

The airstrip is in a shallow forested valley running inland within the Valdivian Coastal Reserve. The runway has an additional  of grass overrun on the south, which ends abruptly in a wooded hillside and rising terrain beyond. North approach and departure are over the ocean.

See also

Transport in Chile
List of airports in Chile

References

External links
OpenStreetMap - Hueicolla
OurAirports - Hueicolla
FallingRain - Hueicolla Airport

Airports in Los Ríos Region
Coasts of Los Ríos Region